Marc Jensen Rieper (born 5 June 1968) is a Danish former professional footballer who played as a centre-back for AGF and Brøndby in Denmark, West Ham United in England and Celtic in Scotland. He was also a regular player in the Denmark national team, appearing in the Euro 1996 and 1998 FIFA World Cup tournaments. He is the older brother of footballer Mads Rieper.

Club career
Born in Rødovre, Rieper started his career at Danish club AGF in 1988. While at AGF, he debuted for the Danish national team in the 1–0 friendly match win against Sweden on 5 September 1990. He played a further three national team matches before moving on to Danish Superliga rivals Brøndby IF in 1992. While at Brøndby, he secured a place in the national team starting line-up and played 38 matches in a row from October 1992 to August 1996.

Rieper won the 1994 Danish Cup trophy with Brøndby before moving abroad in December that year to play for English Premiership club West Ham United, signing initially on loan before a £1 million fee at the end of the season made the transfer permanent.

In 1997, he moved to Scotland to play for Celtic, with whom he won the Scottish league championship in 1997–98. Rieper suffered a toe injury in October 1998 which he never fully recovered from. He did not make another professional appearance and announced his retirement in July 2000.

International career
Rieper played 61 matches and scored two goals for the Denmark national team, first as the defensive partner of Lars Olsen and most prominently as part of a defending duo with Jes Høgh in the UEFA Euro 1996 and 1998 FIFA World Cup tournaments. He was ever-present for the Danish team which won the 1995 King Fahd Cup and played in all of Denmark's three matches at UEFA Euro 1996. At the 1998 FIFA World Cup, Rieper played full-time for the Danish national team, and scored against Saudi Arabia. Denmark's World Cup campaign ended in a quarter-final defeat to eventual runners-up Brazil.

Post-playing career
Following his retirement Rieper spent some time in 2001 as an assistant coach at AGF. Through his connections to Celtic, he brought over many reserve team players to AGF, including future Ireland international Liam Miller. After head coach John Stampe was fired in 2002, Rieper resigned from the club. He now owns and runs a hotel in the town of Aarhus, is a member of the board of directors at AGF and is the owner of women's online fashion store BA10.dk.

Honours
Danish Cup 1994
King Fahd Cup 1995
Scottish Premier Division 1998
Scottish League Cup 1997

References

External links
Danish national team profile
Sporting-Heroes career statistics

1968 births
Living people
People from Rødovre
People named in the Panama Papers
Sportspeople from the Capital Region of Denmark
Danish men's footballers
Association football central defenders
Denmark international footballers
Denmark under-21 international footballers
Danish Superliga players
Premier League players
Scottish Premier League players
Aarhus Gymnastikforening players
Brøndby IF players
West Ham United F.C. players
Celtic F.C. players
1995 King Fahd Cup players
UEFA Euro 1996 players
1998 FIFA World Cup players
FIFA Confederations Cup-winning players
Scottish Football League players
Danish expatriate men's footballers
Danish expatriate sportspeople in England
Expatriate footballers in England
Danish expatriate sportspeople in Scotland
Expatriate footballers in Scotland